Bathycrinicola tumidula is a species of sea snail, a marine gastropod mollusc in the family Eulimidae.

Distribution
This species is distributed within Antarctica waters, these include the Weddell Sea, Ross Sea and Amundsen Sea. Bathycrinicola tumidula is also notable for inhabiting McMurdo Sound, near McMurdo Station, Ross Island here, scientists who inhabit the American station throughout the summer months can observe this species carefully.

References

External links

Eulimidae
Gastropods described in 1912